Juba Airport  is an airport serving Juba, the capital city of South Sudan. The airport is located 5 km (3 mi) northeast of the city's central business district, on the western banks of the White Nile. The city and airport are located in South Sudan's Central Equatoria State.

It is one of the two international airports in South Sudan, the other being Malakal Airport. Juba Airport handles international and local airlines, cargo air traffic and chartered commercial flights. It is also used by the South Sudanese military and by the United Nations UNMISS, UN Humanitarian Air Services UNHAS, World Food Program WFP, ICRC and many NGOs for relief flights for the country.

History
The first Juba airfield was cleared in 1929. The Shell Company constructed the first murram runway in 1931. In February 1931, Imperial Airways opened the first 2,670 miles of the weekly Croydon to Tanganyika Territory (now part of Tanzania) portion of the Cape to Cairo air-route, and established a mooring place near Rejaf to the south of Juba, for Imperial Airways’ Calcutta flying-boats, which carried passengers between Khartoum and Kisumu. Labourers had been settling on the land that has since become the Juba airport's present location and, in 1934, when the Juba aerodrome was expanded and cleared, these residents were relocated. By 1976, the runway had been expanded to 2,400 by 45 meters and paved with asphalt. Access roads leading to the terminal buildings were unsurfaced and "almost impassable during the rainy season." The airport's "very old radio beacon" was located a short distance from the airport, which was also equipped with a weak VHF radio for pilot-to-ground communication. Field lighting was not present.

In early February 1977, the airport was the site of an unsuccessful coup attempt, when ex-Anyanya forces attempted to take the airport.

Airport expansion and country's independence

, Juba International Airport was undergoing improvements and expansion. The work on the airport included expansion of the passenger and cargo terminal buildings, resurfacing of the runway and installation of runway lights to facilitate night operations.

, the day of the country’s independence, Juba International Airport had a new runway light system commissioned with simple approach lights for Runway 13/31, runway edge lights, taxiway lights for Exit Delta, Apron edge lights, illuminated windsocks, ATC tower rotating beacon as well as PAPI for both approaches. The Aerodrome Ground Lighting system AGL manufactured by Safegate.

In July 2014, the government announced a runway extension project to commence in September 2014 lasting 30 months. The project will extend the runway by 700 meters and also resurface the existing 2400 metre runway giving a new 3100 metre runway. The new runway will still be using backtracking access to the new extended 700 meter portion of Runway 13. Building activities for the new terminal building have been underway since 2009 and was halted when civil war broke out in 2014. Since then the half-built terminal has been left abandoned.

In 2016, Juba International Airport was ranked the second worst airport in the world in a survey conducted by The Guide to Sleeping in Airports. It was the worst airport in 2017 and the fourth worst in 2019. During this time the terminal consisted of two adjacent tents to facilitate customs and immigration, arrivals and departures. A new, smaller terminal was built on the site of the original terminal by the Chinese. The new terminal was inaugurated on 29 October 2018.

Facilities

The runway has five serviceable taxiways; Alpha, Bravo, Delta, Echo and Foxtrot (Foxtrot is used by the military exclusively). Backtracking is used frequently for larger airliners to access the full length of the runway.

Airlines and destinations

Passenger

Cargo

Accidents and incidents
On 19 December 2013, a Nova Airways Boeing 737-500 registration ST-NVG suffered nose-gear collapse resulting in major damage when landing at Juba.  This was the same day that many people were being evacuated from Juba because of the South Sudanese Civil War.  The Nova Airways aircraft blocked the runway for several hours, delaying the evacuation. The aircraft was repaired and returned to service.
On 4 November 2015, an An-12BK EY-406 crashed on take-off, 800 metres from the runway. The fully laden Antonov-12 went low over buildings at end of the runway and crashed in a wet area next to the Nile river. There was no fire after the crash. At least 41 people were killed. Three survived the crash, though one later died, leaving a baby girl and a man the only survivors of this crash.
On 10 December 2019, Ethiopian Airlines Flight 357, a Bombardier Dash 8 Q400 registration ET-AQC excursed from the runway during takeoff. The aircraft was substantially damaged. All 21 people on board survived.
On 22 August 2020, an An-26 cargo plane belonging to South West Aviation crashed after taking off on a charter cargo flight to Aweil, South Sudan. 17 people were reported killed.
On 2 November 2021, a cargo An-26 crashed soon after taking off, killing 5 people.

See also
 Equatoria
 List of airports in South Sudan

References

External links

 Location of Juba International Airport At Google Maps
 
 

Airports in South Sudan
Central Equatoria
Buildings and structures in Juba